Horatius may refer to:

People

Roman era
 several ancient Roman men of the gens Horatia, including:
 Quintus Horatius Flaccus, the poet known in English as Horace
 one of the Horatii, three members of the gens Horatia who fought to the death against the Curiatii
 Marcus Horatius Pulvillus, consul in 509 and 507 BC
 Horatius Cocles, hero who defended the Sublician Bridge
 Marcus Horatius Barbatus, consul in 449 BC

Post-Roman era
Horatius Acquaviva d'Aragona (d.1617), an Italian prelate
Horatius  Paulijn (1644-1691), a Dutch painter
Horatius Sebastiani (1771-1851), a French soldier and diplomat
 Horatius Bonar (1808–1889), a Scottish churchman and poet
Horatius "H.H." Coleman (1892-1969), an American church pastor
Horatius Murray (1903-1989), a British Army General

Fictional characters
 Horatius Faversham, a character in the radio series The Penny Dreadfuls Present...

Literature
a poem in the Lays of Ancient Rome by Thomas Babington Macaulay; for the full text of the poem see Horatius)

Other uses
The Horatius Stakes, an American thoroughbred horse race
 G-AAXD Horatius, a named Handley Page H.P.42 airliner

See also
 Horatio (disambiguation)
 Horace (disambiguation)